Gioi is a town and comune in the province of Salerno in the Campania region of south-western Italy. As of 2011 its population was of 1,339.

History 
The comune of Gioi has a history that dates back well over 1000 years. The first permanent inhabitants may have been monks who settled there around the 11th century. The village was fortified in the 15th century, and parts of the fortifications still exist. The population peaked at about 18,000 in the mid 16th century before being decimated by a plague in 1556. A second plague occurred in 1645, after which the prosperity of the village went into long-term decline.

Geography
Located in the middle of Cilento, Gioi borders with the municipalities of Campora, Moio della Civitella, Orria, Salento, Stio and Vallo della Lucania. It counts a single hamlet (frazione), that is the village of Cardile, 6 km far from it.

Main sights
Churches
Church of Sant'Eustachio
Church of San Nicola
Church of San Francesco
Chapel of Madonna della Porta
Chapel of Madonna dello Schito
Chapel of Madonna della Grazie

Palaces
Palace Conti
Palace Ferri
Palace Reielli
Palace Salati

Demographics

Notable people
Leo de Berardinis (1940-2008), stage actor and theatre director
Armando Salati (1884-1963), Vice Consul to the United States
Giuseppe Salati (1847-1930), author of L'Antica Gioi

Genealogy project 
The Genetic Park of Cilento and Vallo di Diano Project was established in 2000, and focuses on the populations of Campora, Gioi, and Cardile. Using village and church records, a pedigree of over 5000 individuals was created that spans 350 years.

See also
La Cappella Madonna della Grazia
Cilentan dialect
Cilento and Vallo di Diano National Park

References

External links

 Comune di Gioi official website 
 Genetic Park of Cilento and Vallo di Diano Project
  Organized Society of Gioiesi in New Jersey

Cities and towns in Campania
Localities of Cilento